I'll Turn to You is a 1946 British drama film directed by Geoffrey Faithfull and starring Terry Randall, Don Stannard and Harry Welchman. It was one of a number of films dealing with the problems of returning servicemen.

Despite not being a musical, it has a lengthy concert segment at the end that allows the title song to wrap up the narrative.

It was shot at the Walton Studios west of London. The film's sets were designed by the art director George Paterson. It was made by Butcher's Film Service as a higher budget film than usual, and like many of the company's output is named after a traditional song of the same title.

Cast

 Terry Randall as Aileen Meredith 
 Don Stannard as Roger Meredith
 Harry Welchman as 	Mr. Collins
 Ann Codrington as Mrs. Collins
 Ellis Irving as Henry Browning
 Irene Handl as Mrs. Gammon
 George Merritt as Cecil Joy
 Nicolette Roeg as Flora Fenton
 Anthony Pendrell as Dick Fenton 
 Leslie Perrins as Mr. Chigwell
 Grace Arnold as Nurse
 Hal Gordon as Taxi Driver 
 Aubrey Mallalieu as Managing Director 
 Hilda Bayley as Gossiping Guest at Party 
 Lesley Osmond as 	Gossiping Guest at Party
 Davina Craig as Telephonist 
 Cameron Hall as The Neighbour
 David Keir as Estate Agent
 Jack Vyvyan as Stage Door Keeper
 Vi Kaley as 	Charlady at Collins's Office 
 Hamilton Keene as 	Hotel Receptionist
 Olive Kirby	as Office Girl
 Harry Bidgood as Orchestra Conductor
 Evelyn Laye as Self 
 Sandy Macpherson as Self
 Sylvia Welling as Self

References

Bibliography
 Spicer, Andrew. European Film Noir. Manchester University Press, 2019.

External links
 

1946 films
1946 drama films
British drama films
Films shot at Nettlefold Studios
Butcher's Film Service films
1940s English-language films
1940s British films